Rwanda competed at the 2020 Summer Olympics in Tokyo. Originally scheduled to take place from 24 July to 9 August 2020, the Games were postponed to 23 July to 8 August 2021, because of the COVID-19 pandemic. It was the nation's tenth consecutive appearance at the Summer Olympics.

Competitors
The following is the list of number of competitors in the Games.

Athletics

Rwandan athletes achieved the entry standards, either by qualifying time or by world ranking, in the following track and field events (up to a maximum of 3 athletes in each event):

Track & road events

Cycling

Road
Rwanda entered one rider to compete in the men's Olympic road race, by virtue of his top 50 national finish (for men) in the UCI World Ranking.

Swimming

Rwanda received a universality invitation from FINA to send two top-ranked swimmers (one per gender) in their respective individual events to the Olympics, based on the FINA Points System of June 28, 2021.

References

Nations at the 2020 Summer Olympics
2020
2021 in Rwandan sport